Dabar (lit. "Beaver") is the river in Bosanska Krajina region, in Bosnia and Herzegovina. It is a left tributary of the Sana river. The river Dabar emerges from Dabar cave, and runs for 4,5 kilometres eastward toward the Sana river. The two river meat near Sanski Most, just 5 kilometres upstream from the town.

References

Rivers of Bosnia and Herzegovina
Tributaries of the Sana (river)